Ryan Finnigan (born 23 September 2003) is an English professional footballer who plays as a midfielder for League Two side Crewe Alexandra on loan from Southampton.

Club career
Finnigan signed his first professional contract, with Southampton, in December 2020. On 19 January 2021, Finnigan made his first professional appearance in Southampton's victory over Shrewsbury Town in the FA Cup.

On 18 January 2023, Finnigan joined League Two side Crewe Alexandra for the remainder of the season, making his Crewe debut against Stockport County at Gresty Road on 31 January 2023. In his fifth appearance for the Railwaymen, he scored his first professional goal, helping Crewe to a 2-0 home win against Hartlepool United on 14 February 2023.

Career statistics

Club
.

References

External links
Southampton FC profile

2003 births
Living people
English footballers
Southampton F.C. players
Crewe Alexandra F.C. players
Association football midfielders